The Horden shooting was a mass shooting in Horden, England, on 1 January 2012, also called the New Year's Day shooting. 42-year-old Michael Atherton shot his partner Susan McGoldrick, her sister Alison Turnbull and her daughter Tanya Turnbull with a shotgun, before killing himself. They were all killed in Atherton's home, where three others escaped from an upstairs window, one of whom had suffered minor injuries from the spray of the gun.

Background 
Michael Atherton, a taxi driver, had a licence which allowed him to legally own firearms, six in total - three of which were shotguns. Despite having his guns confiscated in 2008 by police, they were later returned.

He was arrested for affray at a local club, and months later armed police were called to his home after he threatened to "blow his head off" to his family.

See also 

 Cumbria shootings
 List of massacres in Great Britain
 List of mass shootings in the United Kingdom
 Plymouth shooting

References

2010s in County Durham
2010s mass shootings in the United Kingdom
2012 in England
2012 mass shootings in Europe
2012 murders in the United Kingdom
21st-century mass murder in the United Kingdom
January 2012 crimes
January 2012 events in the United Kingdom
Crime in County Durham
Deaths by firearm in England
Mass murder in 2012
Mass murder in England
Mass shootings in England
Murder–suicides in the United Kingdom